This article contains information about the literary events and publications of 1550.

Events
June – Robert Estienne leaves Paris for Geneva, where he sets up a printing press.
July 17 – King Edward VI of England gives Humphrey Powell a grant to start printing in Ireland.
unknown dates
The first book in Slovene, Catechismus, is written by Protestant reformer Primož Trubar and printed in Schwäbisch Hall, Holy Roman Empire, followed by his Abecedarium.
Nostradamus' first almanac is printed.
The Chinese shenmo fantasy novel Fengshen Yanyi is first published in book form.

New books

Prose
Leandro Alberti – Istoria di Bologna
Martin Bucer – De regno Christi
Thomas Cranmer – Defence of the True and Catholic Doctrine of the Sacrament of the Body and Blood of Christ
Doddayya – Chandraprabha Purana
Louis Maigret – Traité de la Grammaire française (the first grammatical description of French)
Ramamatya – Svaramelakalanidhi (treatise on music)
Richard Sherry – A Treatise of Schemes and Tropes
Primož Trubar
Catechismus
Abecedarium
The Facetious Nights of Straparola (the first European storybook of fairy tales)
Giorgio Vasari – Lives of the Most Excellent Painters, Sculptors, and Architects
Rosary of the Philosophers

Drama
Thomas Naogeorgus – Agricultura sacra
Hans Sachs
Der fahrende Schüler im Paradies
Das Wildbad

Poetry
See 1550 in poetry

Births
December 22 – Cesare Cremonini, Italian philosopher (died 1631)
unknown dates
Wacker von Wackenfels, German diplomat, scholar and author (died 1619)
Zang Maoxun, Chinese playwright (died 1620)
Probable year of birth – Philip Henslowe, Elizabethan theatrical entrepreneur and impresario (died 1616)

Deaths
February – Marcantonio Flaminio, Latin-language poet (born c. 1498)
July 9 (probable date) – Jacopo Bonfadio, Italian historian, executed for sodomy (born c. 1508)
December 8 – Gian Giorgio Trissino, Italian poet, dramatist and grammarian (born 1478)
unknown date
Eguinaire Baron, French legal writer (born 1495)
William Lamb alias Paniter, Scottish writer, cleric and lawyer (born c. 1493)

References

Years of the 16th century in literature